The 2018 Tashkent Challenger was a professional tennis tournament played on hard courts. It was the eleventh edition of the tournament which was part of the 2018 ATP Challenger Tour. It took place in Tashkent, Uzbekistan between 8 and 13 October 2018.

Singles main-draw entrants

Seeds

 1 Rankings are as of 1 October 2018.

Other entrants
The following players received wildcards into the singles main draw:
  Alen Avidzba
  Jurabek Karimov
  Khumoyun Sultanov
  Dimitriy Voronin

The following player received entry into the singles main draw using a protected ranking:
  Egor Gerasimov

The following players received entry from the qualifying draw:
  Félix Auger-Aliassime
  Mathias Bourgue
  Frederico Ferreira Silva
  Rubin Statham

The following player received entry as a lucky loser:
  Roman Safiullin

Champions

Singles

  Félix Auger-Aliassime def.  Kamil Majchrzak 6–3, 6–2.

Doubles

  Sanjar Fayziev /  Jurabek Karimov def.  Federico Gaio /  Enrique López Pérez 6–2, 6–7(3–7), [11–9].

References

2018 ATP Challenger Tour
2018
October 2018 sports events in Asia